The Chief Justice of the Supreme Court of Korea is the Chief Justice of the Supreme Court of Korea. As presiding judge of Grand bench composed of two-thirds of fourteen Supreme Court Justices, the Chief represents the Supreme Court of Korea. The Chief Justice is regarded as one of two equivalent heads of judicial branch in Government of South Korea. Another head is President of the Constitutional Court of Korea. The current Chief Justice of the Supreme Court of Korea is Kim Myeong-soo.

Appointment and tenure
Under chapter 5, article 104(1) of Constitution, and article 12(1) of Court Organization Act, the Chief Justice is appointed by the President of South Korea with the consent of the National Assembly of South Korea.

While article 105(1) of Constitution sets term length of the Chief Justice as non-renewable single term of six-years, its mandatory age of retirement is delegated to sub-constitutional regulation by article 105(4) of Constitution. Currently, the Chief Justice's mandatory age of retirement is 70 by article 45(4) of Court Organization Act.

Powers and duties
As head member of the Supreme Court of Korea, the Chief Justice's formal main role is participating in decision of the Court as one of Supreme Court Justices. However, since most of cases in the Court are handled by three different Panels or 'Petty benches'() each of consisting four Supreme Court Justices except the Chief Justice, the Chief cannot participate in ruling of daily cases. Rather, the Chief Justice only participates in 'Grand bench()' convened with more than two-thirds of all fourteen Justices, as presiding judge.

More substantial role of the Chief Justice is governing political and administrative tasks in ordinary courts, as the Chief is head of hierarchy of conventional judiciary consisted of all ordinary courts in South Korea.

 The Chief recommends candidate for all other thirteen Supreme Court Justices under article 104(2) of Constitution. Though all Supreme Court Justices are formally appointed by the President of South Korea with the consent of the National Assembly of South Korea, the Chief's power to recommend candidate for each of Supreme Court Justices supports influence over composition of South Korean Supreme Court.

 The Chief nominates candidate for three of nine Constitutional Court Justices under article 111(3) of Constitution. Though all Constitutional Court Justices are formally appointed by the President of South Korea, its nomination of candidate is usually reflected in final appointment by the President. Three of other six Constitutional Court Justices are elected by National Assembly of South Korea. The left three are directly appointed by the President.

 The Chief serves as Chair at Council of Supreme Court Justices() composed of all fourteen Supreme Court Justices including the Chief, which supervises administrative tasks in ordinary courts under article 16(1) and 17 of Court Organization Act. When vote ties, the Chief has casting vote.

 The Chief appoints one of thirteen Supreme Court Justices as Minister of National Court Administration(), which is centralized organization to govern all matters on judicial administration of ordinary South Korean courts, under article 68(1) of Court Organization Act.

 The Chief appoints every Judges in lower ordinary courts, with consent of the Council of Supreme Court Justices under article 104(3) of Constitution. Substantial power of this article is embodied by article 44(1) and 44-2(3) of Court Organization Act. Under article 44-2(3) of the Act, the Chief evaluates all Judges in lower ordinary courts regularly and reflects it into personnel affairs of Judges, such as transferring Judges from one lower court to other lower court (even against will of such Judge), or declining renew of lower court Judge's 10-year length term.

 The Chief also appoints every law clerks and court officials (including Judicial Assistant Officer which has similar role as german Rechtspfleger) under article 53, 53-2 and 54 of Court Organization Act. 

 The Chief can present written opinion to the National Assembly, on enacting or revising laws related to administration of ordinary courts, under article 9(3) of Court Organization Act.

List of Chief Justices

See also
 Judiciary of South Korea
 Supreme Court of Korea

References

External links
 Official english website of Supreme Court of Korea
 CONSTITUTION OF THE REPUBLIC OF KOREA, Korea Legislation Research Institute Website
 COURT ORGANIZATION ACT, Korea Legislation Research Institute Website

Judiciary of South Korea